Thomas Aston (born 1876; date of death unknown) was a footballer who played four games in the English Football League for Port Vale at the start of the 1900–01 season.

Career
Aston played for Ironbridge before joining Port Vale in May 1900. He made his debut on 1 September, in a 2–2 draw with Small Heath at Athletic Ground. He scored his first goal in the English Football League 14 days later in a 2–0 win over Lincoln City. He played a total of four Second Division games, but within a few weeks he realized that his work commitments made getting to matches difficult and so he left the club before the month was out.

Career statistics
Source:

References

1876 births
Year of death missing
English footballers
Association football wingers
Port Vale F.C. players
English Football League players